Nehemia Bill Solossa or Nehemia Solossa (born July 5, 1986 in Sorong, Sorong Regency, West Papua) is an Indonesian footballer. He currently plays for Barito Putera in Indonesia Super League. His brothers, Ortizan and Boaz, are also footballers.

Family
Nehemia was born in the Solossa family, a well-known family in the province of West Papua. Nehemia is the fifth son of Christopher Solossa and Merry Solossa.

His uncle, Jaap Solossa, was the governor of Papua before he died in 2005. Nehemia was born into a footballing family. Almost all of them were professionals, including his brother Ortizan and Boaz Solossa.

References

External links
 Nehemia Bill Salossa at ligaindonesia.co.id 
 PERSIS SOLO - Persis Incar Nemi Solossa

1983 births
Living people
Indonesian footballers
Indonesian Premier Division players
Liga 1 (Indonesia) players
Papuan people
Persikad Depok players
Persikabpas Pasuruan players
Persis Solo players
Persibo Bojonegoro players
Persiram Raja Ampat players
PS Barito Putera players
Indonesian Christians
People from Sorong
Association football forwards
Sportspeople from Papua